In functional analysis and related areas of mathematics an FK-AK space or FK-space with the AK property is an FK-space which contains the space of finite sequences and has a Schauder basis.

Examples and non-examples

  the space of convergent sequences with the supremum norm has the AK property.
  the absolutely p-summable sequences with the  norm have the AK property.
  with the supremum norm does not have the AK property.

Properties

An FK-AK space  has the property

FK-AK spaces are separable spaces.

See also

References

Topological vector spaces